The Free Wales Army (FWA) was a paramilitary Welsh nationalist organisation, formed at Lampeter in Ceredigion by Julian Cayo-Evans in 1963. Its objective was to establish an independent Welsh republic.

History

Overview
The FWA first appeared in public at a 1965 protest against the construction of the Llyn Celyn reservoir.  In 1966 they took part in Irish celebrations of the 50th anniversary of the Easter Rising, marching in Dublin. A 1967 late-night television interview with David Frost brought the group to the attention of a wider audience. The group courted publicity, and its leaders attracted a great deal of media attention with extravagant claims of financial support from millionaires, "links with the IRA and Basque separatists," dogs trained to carry explosives, etc. Members wore home-made uniforms and marched in historic sites like Machynlleth, as well as carrying out manoeuvres with small arms and explosives in the Welsh countryside and claiming responsibility for many of Mudiad Amddiffyn Cymru's bombings. They also advocated for families of victims of the Aberfan disaster whose compensation claims were being blocked, "marching on their behalf and working behind the scenes for them."

Army
The group was generally not taken seriously by the media, and one government memo warned against "taking the organisation's activities too seriously" saying this "would give to it an unmerited importance and publicity which its leaders are plainly seeking". However, against a backdrop of Welsh nationalist bombings and protests against the investiture of King Charles as Prince of Wales the FWA presented an appealing target to the government, and in 1969 nine members were arrested and charged with public order offences. The trial, in Swansea, lasted 53 days, ending on the day of the investiture. On the first day of the trial the defendants were "greeted with an impromptu recital of Hen Wlad Fy Nhadau from the public gallery." Almost all of the prosecution's evidence came from journalists who had reported the group's claims.  Julian Cayo-Evans, his second-in-command, Dennis Coslett (who refused to speak English throughout the trial), and four other members were convicted; Cayo-Evans and Coslett spent 15 months in jail.

The Army's motto was "Fe godwn ni eto", Welsh for "We will rise again". Its crest was Eryr Wen, a stylised white eagle mounted on dark green shield, with the flag of Wales at the top left hand corner. The eagle represents the eagle of Snowdonia, which in Welsh mythology is said to protect Wales, mentioned in the poem Mab Darogan. This 13th century poem states; "Myrddin's prophecy is that a king shall come with heroism from among the Welsh people. Prophets have said that generous men shall be reborn of the lineage of the eagles of Snowdonia." The modern symbol itself was designed by Harri Webb, a Welsh republican poet who edited The Welsh Republican in the 1950s.

The FWA was rumoured to have received arms from the Official IRA (OIRA), although Cayo-Evans later denied this. In Ireland, one rumour—used against the OIRA by its rivals within Irish Republicanism—was that the OIRA had given or sold most of its weapons to the FWA as part of its turn away from political violence, leaving it defenceless when intercommunal violence erupted in Northern Ireland in August 1969. Scott Millar, coauthor of a history of the OIRA, wrote that there was contact between the two groups (including FWA members training in Ireland) but no large-scale transfer of arms took place.

In 2005, the Western Mail newspaper published information from The National Archives, asserting that Cayo-Evans had a "mental age of 12", and that Coslett was "unbalanced". In 2009, photos of the group's exercises taken by undercover police officers (and introduced as evidence at the 1969 trial) were brought out of storage and put on display in a museum exhibit.

See also
 Meibion Glyndŵr
 Gethin ap Gruffydd

References

Further reading

 Freedom Fighters, Wales's forgotten war 1963-1993,John Humphries(2008).
 Thomas, Wyn (2013), Hands Off Wales: Nationhood and Militancy, (Gomer) 
 Dr Wyn Thomas (y Lolfa, 2019) John Jenkins: The Reluctant Revolutionary? Hardback: ; Paperback:

External links
 Programme of Photographic Exhibition. Hidden Country: Photographs of the Free Wales Army 1966-68. 7 July - 29 August 2009. John Hansard Gallery. University of Southampton.

Welsh nationalism
Paramilitary organisations based in the United Kingdom
Political organisations based in Wales
Republican parties
Republicanism in Wales
Republicanism in the United Kingdom
Terrorism in Wales